Maravatío is a municipality in the Mexican state of Michoacán, representing 1.17% of its land area, or 691.55 km2.

Etymology 
The modern word Maravatío comes from the Purépecha word Marhabatio, meaning a precious place or thing.

History 
Maravatio has a complicated history spanning hundreds of years. Though officially founded in 1540, the area had previously experienced settlement by Otomi, Mazahua, and Purepecha peoples. After Spanish contact, it functioned as a bulwark against various Chichimeca tribes of the north, primarily the Pame and Guamare, and eventually was classified as an "Indian Republic" governed by Don Pedro Juárez.

Geography 
Neighboring locations include Guanajuato to the north; Contepec and Tlalpujahua to the east; Senguio, Irimbo, and Ciudad Hidalgo to the south; and Zinapécuaro to the west.

Economy 
The economy of Maravatío is primarily agricultural in nature, focusing on the production of strawberries, corn, beans, potatoes, wheat, and tomatoes. The municipality also has a herd of cattle with some economic importance, industries focused on the fabrication of ornamental ironwork, as well as business sectors.

Tourist attractions 
Some of the principal places of interest to tourists in the municipality are the following:
 The Parish Church of San Juan Bautista
 Hacienda de Pomoca (the place where Melchor Ocampo lived)
 El Teatro Morelos (the Morelos Theater)
 El Mirador (the viewpoint)

The city contains the parochial temple of San Juan Bautista, built in the baroque style in the 16th century, as well as the chapel of the Immaculate Conception, in the mudéjar style; the chapel of the Lord of the Column; the Chapel of Saint Michael Archangel, in San Miguel Curahuango; the temple of Saint Mary, in Ziritzícuaro; and the temple of Uripitío. 

Also of interest are the former haciendas of Apeo that were the property of Don Mateo Echaíz de Santa Elena in 1857; the house where Don Miguel Hidalgo stayed, near Independence Gate; the railway station, at which trains first arrived in 1883; and the Morelos Theater, constructed in the Porfirio Díaz era, which was inaugurated with a performance by the soprano Ángela Peralta.

Maravatío is a good base for visiting monarch butterfly sanctuaries between October and March, and there are many hot springs near the city suitable for bathing.

Along with tourists attractions, there are many places to enjoy a delicious meal, fruit, or desserts at a very low price.

Transport 

Coaches run by several different companies run to and from Maravatio, connecting nearby towns like Atlacomulco and Ciudad Hidalgo, cities further afield such as Mexico City, Morelia and Querétaro, and international destinations like Atlanta, El Paso and Immokalee.

The nearest airport is Morelia International Airport.

Politics 
Executive power in the municipality is vested in the presidente municipal or municipal president. The following table lists Maravatío's past executives:

Famous people 
Cayetano Gómez de Soria y Piñón (1791-?). Entrepreneur and landowner. A person of Spanish ancestry born in Mexico with humble beginnings, who began buying property at an early age until becoming one of the most important owners of haciendas in Michoacán.

References

External links 

Website of Maravatío, Michoacán nuestromaravatio.com.mx
Website oficial, turístico y local
Página oficial del Municipio de Maravatio de Ocampo
Enciclopedia de los Municipios de México
Universidad Michoacana
arxfest ,
maravatio.pueblox.com

Municipalities of Michoacán